Stanley Akoy (born 17 November 1996) is a Dutch professional footballer who plays as a midfielder for Cypriot Second Division club Olympias Lympion.

Career
Born in Purmerend, Akoy made his debut for SC Cambuur on 8 August 2019, coming on as a second-half substitute in a 2–0 defeat away at De Graafschap.

In January 2022, he signed for Eerste Divisie club SC Telstar.

Akoy joined Cypriot Second Division club Olympias Lympion on 31 August 2022.

Personal life
Born in the Netherlands, Akoy is of Surinamese descent.

Career statistics

References

External links
 

1996 births
Living people
People from Purmerend
Association football midfielders
Dutch footballers
Dutch expatriate footballers
Dutch sportspeople of Surinamese descent
AFC Ajax players
SC Cambuur players
SC Telstar players
Eerste Divisie players
Footballers from North Holland
Expatriate footballers in Cyprus
Dutch expatriate sportspeople in Cyprus